The Toronto Catholic District School Board (TCDSB, known as English-language Separate District School Board No. 40 prior to 1999) is an English-language public-separate school board for Toronto, Ontario, Canada, headquartered in North York. It is one of the two English boards of education serving the city of Toronto. With more than 84,000 students, the TCDSB is one of the largest school boards in Canada, and is the largest publicly funded Catholic school board in the world. Until 1998, it was known as the Metropolitan Separate School Board (MSSB) as an anglophone and francophone separate school district.

History

On April 2, 1953, the Metropolitan Separate School Board, officially known as the Metropolitan Toronto Roman Catholic Separate School Board (MTRCSSB) was formed as the governing body of all publicly funded Roman Catholic schools in Toronto through the merger of several separate boards in Metro Toronto. The merger was passed through Bill 37, the Metropolitan Separate School Board Act.

At its peak, the board operated 185 anglophone and 6 francophone elementary schools and 41 anglophone and 1 francophone secondary schools as of 1990 with 100,000 students attended all MSSB schools. The MSSB took over seven high schools transferred from the Metropolitan Toronto School Board (MTSB) in 1988, with one of them being a francophone Catholic high school, the institution that has been lost since 1968. The MSSB was the largest school board in Canada at the time.

In 1997, as a result of Bill 104, the Fewer School Boards Act, the boards were reorganized resulting in the separation of English and French language schools. The MSSB became known as English-language Separate District School Board No. 40 and renamed itself to the Toronto Catholic District School Board in 1999 while the former Section de langue française unit became part of the new French-language Separate District School Board No. 64 which later became Conseil scolaire de district catholique Centre-Sud.

The board headquarters were located on Duke Street, then Jarvis Street, and the MSSB moved its operations in 1964 to 150 Laird Drive, the former headquarters of Durant Motors and later, Imperial Oil. In 1982, the board moved to its current administrative headquarters and offices on 80 Sheppard Avenue East. The school board also had the offices for Section de langue française on Drewry Avenue, opened in 1989 in the former Lewis S. Beattie Secondary School, though it has since been occupied by Conseil scolaire catholique MonAvenir as its administrative offices.

Organization
The Toronto Catholic District School Board mission statement relies on as "an inclusive learning community uniting home, parish and school and rooted in the love of Christ" that "educates students to grow in grace and knowledge and to lead lives of faith, hope and charity." The vision encourages learning communities of the Board to "transform the world through witness, faith, innovation and action."

The school board is governed by 12 elected trustees who serve for a four-year term. Each year one secondary school student is selected to serve on the board as a student trustee (who is not entitled to vote). The chair of the board, the vice-chair, and the honorary treasurer are elected at the inaugural meeting of the board, and serve for one year. As of August 2013, Ann Andrachuk serves as chair, and Sal Piccininni serves as vice-chair. Trustees are paid $18,500 a year in salary, and can claim up to $18,000 for expenses. Prior to the 1998 separation of French-language schools, the Metropolitan Separate School Board had three French language seats. The policies of the Board are administered by the Director of Education and designates.

There are more than 91,000 students serving over 195 Catholic schools, and represent close to 475,000 Catholic school supporters in all of Toronto. The TCDSB also has staff consisting of 6,000 teachers, 2,800 support staff, 360 principals and vice principals, and 200 administrators.

In addition, the Board operates standing three committees: the Student Achievement and Well Being, Catholic Education and Human Resources, Corporate Affairs, Strategic Planning and Property, & Governance Framework.

Trustees

Chairs of the Board
Italics indicate the trustee remains active.

Averell Robinson, Q.C. - 1953–1954; Original chair of the MSSB
Rev. Msgr. Hugh Callaghan, D.P. - 1954–1955 
Gerard Godin - 1956–1957
Georges B. Heenan - 1958–1959
Michael J. Duggan - 1960–1962 
Edward J. Brisbois - 1963–1965 
Dr. John J. Andrachuk - 1966–1967 
Rev. Msgr. Percy H. Johnson, P.H. 1968–1969; School named after him.
J.A. Fullerton - 1970–1971 
J.A. Marrese -  1972–1974
Joseph Grittani - 1975–1976 
Rev. E.F. Boehler - 1977–1978
Bruno M. Suppa - 1979–1980
Paul J. Duggan - 1981–1982
Edward T. McMahon - 1983–1984; 1996–1997
Rev. E.F. Boehler - 1984–1985
Rev. C. Matthews, S.J. - 1985–1986
Caroline M. DiGiovanni - 1986–1988
Michael Lofranco - 1988–1989
Donald E. Clune - 1989–1992
Elvira DeMonte - 1992–1994
Paul B.R. Fernandes - 1994–1996
Joseph Martino - 1997–1999 - Last chair as MSSB and first chair of the reorganized TCDSB.
Rose Andrachuk - 1999–2000
Mike Del Grande - 2000–2001 - Later became city councilor; 2014–2015
Joseph Carnevale - 2001–2003; 
Oliver Carroll - 2003–2007 - Ousted in early 2009 for conflict of interest charges. Now serves as a teacher for the Toronto District School Board since 2010 and teaches at Scarborough Centre for Alternative Studies from 2012 onwards.
Catherine LeBlanc-Miller - 2008–2009
Angela Kennedy - 2009–2010 - later removed by the judge and was later re-elected; 2015–2016
Ann Andrachuk - 2010-2013
Jo-Ann Davis - 2013–2014
Barbara Poplawski - 2017–present

Directors of Education

Current
The current director of education is Dr. Brendan Browne, who was appointed in 2020. Prior to his appointment, Browne served as the central superintendent for the Toronto District School Board covering schools in most of the former North York and Scarborough.

Past directors
B. E. Nelligan - 1965–1983
Berchman Kipp - 1983–1989
Tony Barone - 1989–1996
Norm Forma - 1996–1997
Johanne Stewart - 1997–2001
Tom Donavan - 2001–2005
Noel Martin (Acting) - 2005
Kevin Kobus - 2005–2007
Les Nemes - 2007–2009
Ann Perron - 2009–2011
Bruce Rodrigues - 2011–2013 (now CEO at EQAO)
Angela Gauthier - 2013-2017 (served as Interim Director in 2011)
Rory McGuckin - 2017-2020

Charity
The Angel Foundation for Learning (AFL) is a TCDSB-organized charity that was founded on April 23, 1987, as the Metropolitan Toronto Catholic Education Foundation (MTCEF) to serve and support the needs of the education of younger Roman Catholic students in the City of Toronto.

School building architecture
Like the TDSB-built schools, 70% of the TCDSB stock of school buildings outside of the old City of Toronto were built after World War II and during the 1950s. These are typically Mid-Century modern in style with two to three storey brick facade and large double hung windows albeit from the cross attached. Some are built in Tudor Gothic style ones in the late 1800s.

Schools

School bus transportation
The following service providers have been contracted by the school board:
 Attridge Transportation
 Dignity Transportation
 First Student Canada
 McCluskey Transportation Services
 Sharp Bus Lines
 Stock Transportation
 Switzer-Carty Transportation
 Toronto Transit Commission
 Wheelchair Accessible Transit

Uniforms
Uniforms are mandatory for students at the secondary level and elementary starting in the fall 2011. In 2010 some elementary schools started implementing use of uniforms.

In 1988, the MSSB ruled that public separate high schools are required to wear uniforms. At the time, all of the high schools in Scarborough except for Newman had uniforms. Some trustees anticipated protests from parents and students from Newman.

, all TCDSB elementary students must wear a uniform of a white or navy blue  top, and navy blue bottoms. This is enforced in special programs such as the gifted program and ME.

Controversies

Enrolment of non-Catholics
While Catholic high schools are funded by the provincial government, making them open to any students who wish to attend, elementary schools do not have to enroll non-Catholic students. Many argue that the practice of fully funding separate schools exclusively for the Catholic faith is discriminatory to other religions (the United Nations has twice chastised the province for this policy). Supporters of the current Catholic education system point out that it has existed, in one form or another, since Confederation, and that the Constitution Act, 1867 enshrines the right to government-funded religious education to all Catholics. The opposition, however, argues that this is an appeal to tradition, and point to other provinces in Canada which amended the constitution to abolish Catholic school funding. It is up to the school principal whether or not non-Catholics are enrolled.

Government funding
Recently, the issue of government funding for religious schools has become a major political issue (see 2007 Ontario general election), with PC Party Leader John Tory supporting an extension of funding to all religious schools, Dalton McGuinty's Liberals and Howard Hampton's NDP supporting the status quo, and Frank de Jong's Greens alone calling for elimination of public funding for all religious schools (including Catholic Schools).

Labour issues
The first strikes occurred on April 5–11, 1986 when 6,000 teachers of the Metro Separate School Board went on strike with over 100,000 students affected.

From August 2002, the Toronto Catholic elementary teachers were without a contract and imposed work to rule beginning February 2003. With stalled negotiations, the TCDSB officially locked out the teachers on May 16, 2003, and the strike lasted 12 days which left 69,000 students affected. The lockout ended when the Ontario government enacted back-to-work legislation on June 3, 2003.

Conflict arose once again when the TCDSB elementary teachers imposed work to rule once more in 2016.

Again in 2021, during the middle of a pandemic, teachers imposed work to rule, leaving report cards blank and ordering their members to not help in distribution of their students personal belongs in June 2021, without resolution in sight as of August 2021.

Trustee spending scandal
The board was embroiled in controversy in May 2008 when a report commissioned by the provincial government uncovered spending abuses by certain trustees, including charges for meals, promotional materials, and prohibited benefits. Provincial supervisor Norbert Hartmann was appointed to oversee administration of the board as a result.

Incidents between students and faculty
During a school trip organized by Holy Spirit Catholic School's eighth-grade students, vice-principal Stephen Patel threw a shoe at 14-year-old student Ian Goulbourne in the forehead while on the excursion at Montreal on the school bus on April 24, 2013. Goulborune was taken to the Montreal Children's Hospital to be treated and Patel was sent home the next day on the Via Rail train on paid leave by the TCDSB while it investigated such incident.

A few weeks later, Ferdinando Marrello, a teacher at Monsignor Fraser College was charged with allegations of assaulting an female student who was grabbed by the throat and punched in the face.

In August 2018, Gerry McGilly, 47-year-old former English teacher at Bishop Allen Academy was sentenced to 2–3 years in prison after he pleaded guilty to luring, making child pornography and sexual exploitation of his students, including three 17-year-old victims, dated between 2014 and 2017.

On May 1, 2019, Toronto Police formally charged 35-year-old Justin Iozzo, teacher of Father John Redmond Catholic Secondary School of one count of sexual assault and one count of sexual interference that occurred in December 2016 when a student was assaulted on school property. Iozzo had been employed by the Board since 2012 and started his teaching career at Stella Maris and St. John the Evangelist Catholic Schools. However, thirteen days later, Toronto Police arrested 36-year-old Brian Ross, a teacher and coach at Senator O'Connor College School, who is facing charges of sexual assault stemming from a string of incidents during the 2011–12 academic year including a 16-year-old female student being assaulted during his 10-year tenure at Marshall McLuhan Catholic Secondary School and another in March 2017.

LGBT issues 
The TCDSB has a number of issues with the LGBT communities and the Roman Catholic education in Toronto.

In May 2013, two trustees, Gary Tanuan and John Del Grande, the son of Mike Del Grande, passed a motion to eliminate Gay-straight alliances in all TCDSB schools. The motion stated that the "Toronto Catholic District School Board schools shall have no Gay Straight Alliance (GSA) clubs or similar." Tanuan's motion stemmed from a report for all anti-bullying clubs to adhere to the "Respecting Difference" report issued by the Ontario Catholic School Trustees' Association in January 2012. This report offered guidelines for Catholic schools that included calling groups like GSAs "Respecting Differences" clubs and avoiding discussions of sexual attraction, political activism and gender identity.

However, in November 2020, the TCDSB imposed sanctions against Mike Del Grande over the LGBT2Q+ comments during the November 7, 2019 meeting for comparing homosexuality to bestiality, pedophilia and cannibalism. Del Grande violated the code of conduct for trustees even though he was acting within his role as a trustee to debate the motion.
 
On January 8, 2021, the TCDSB removed the Lesbian Gay Bi Trans Youth Line, a phone peer support line for youth, from their online mental health resource list for students. The removal of YouthLine coincided the same time as when Joe Volpe ran an opinion piece in Corriere Canadese purporting that YouthLine is inappropriate. YouthLine refuted Volpe's article, calling it "homophobic, transphobic, and racist." YouthLine reaffirmed that their anonymous services provide queer, transgender and questioning youth much needed information and resources. Pride Toronto called TCDSB's decision "another example of systemic homophobia and transphobia that continues to run deep within the publicly-funded school board." In May 2022, Youthline and the other defendants won their case in the Ontario Superior Court of Justice, and all of Volpe's charges against them were dropped.

On May 6, 2021, the TCDSB voted to recognize June as Pride Month and the raising of the LGBT rainbow flag in all schools and board offices for the first time since the board's inception in 1953. The move comes after Halton Catholic District School Board rejected the vote on raising the gay flag while the Waterloo Catholic District School Board approved the raising of the rainbow flag a month prior.

Logo
The official symbol of the Toronto Catholic District School Board was designed in 1969 by the internationally recognized design artist, Allan Fleming, who designed the Canadian National logo. It combines the cross, the anchor, and the heart representing the three theological virtues of faith, hope and charity.  It is based on the cross and anchor symbol used by the early Christians in the catacombs, the added heart representing humanity.

See also

 Roman Catholic Archdiocese of Toronto
 Toronto District School Board
 Conseil scolaire Viamonde
 Conseil scolaire catholique MonAvenir
List of school districts in Ontario

References

Further reading
Toughill, Kelly. "Catholic board offers 10% over 2 years." Toronto Star. October 19, 1987. News p. A2.
Daly, Rita. "Trustees attack proposal to cut separate board by four seats." Toronto Star (FIN Edition). January 18, 1988. News p. A6.
Daly, Rita. "French school trustees get okay on alcohol." Toronto Star. September 21, 1990. News p. A6.
Small, Peter. "Separate schools' deficit up $3 million Trustee blames previous board." Toronto Star. October 11, 1996. News p. A6.
The History of the Toronto Catholic District School Board

External links
 Toronto Catholic District School Board
 Toronto Catholic District School Board (1998–1999 archive, using Metropolitan Separate School Board website domain)
 Angel Foundation for Learning

 
1953 establishments in Ontario
Christian education in Canada
Organizations established in 1953
Roman Catholic school districts in Ontario
Schools in Toronto
Roman Catholic Archdiocese of Toronto